Cascavel Clube Recreativo, more commonly referred to as Cascavel CR, is a Brazilian professional association football club in Cascavel, Paraná which currently plays in Campeonato Paranaense, the top division of the Paraná state football league.

History
The club was founded on December 17, 2001, after Cascavel Esporte Clube, SOREC and Cascavel S/A merged.

Stadium

Cascavel Clube Recreativo play their home games at Estádio Olímpico Regional Arnaldo Busatto. The stadium has a maximum capacity of 45,000 people.

Titles

State titles
Campeonato Paranaense (1): 1980

External links 
Official Website

References

Association football clubs established in 2001
Football clubs in Paraná (state)
2001 establishments in Brazil